A stratum is a layer of sedimentary rock or sediment.

Stratum may also refer to:

Science and technology
Stratum (linguistics), a language influencing or influenced through language contact
Stratum (statistics), in stratified sampling, a homogeneous subgroup of members in the population
Stratum, an element of a topologically stratified space
Clock stratum, in a clock network, a hierarchical level reflecting the quality of a clock

Other uses
Stratum, Netherlands, a city district of Eindhoven
Stratum (album), a 2012 album by Drottnar
Stratum (sculpture), a series of sculptures by Mikyoung Kim in Portland, Oregon, US

See also
Strata (disambiguation)
Stratification (disambiguation)
Substrate (disambiguation)
Superstrate